

Events

Births
 Juan Ruiz (died 1350), known as the Archpriest of Hita (Arcipreste de Hita), was a medieval Spanish poet

Deaths
 Estimated date of death of Sa‘di (born 1184), Persian poet
 January 9 - Wen Tianxiang (born 1236), Chinese scholar-general, poet, chancellor

References

13th-century poetry
Poetry